The Price of Civilization: Reawakening American Virtue and Prosperity is a book by economist Jeffrey Sachs. It was published by Random House on October 4, 2011 in the United States and by Bodley Head in the United Kingdom on October 6 of the same year. In the book, Sachs criticizes excessive lobbying, as well as a poor response by American government to globalization, and describes American politics as a corporatocracy in which "powerful corporate interest groups dominate the policy agenda." Sachs suggests that both political parties are right-of-center, and identifies four powerful lobbies: the military–industrial complex, the Wall Street–Washington complex, the Big Oil–transport–military complex and the health care industry.

The book is 336 pages long. As described by Random House: the book is an "incisive diagnosis of our country’s economic ills but also an urgent call for Americans to restore the virtues of fairness, honesty, and foresight as the foundations of national prosperity."  The title comes from the quote from Oliver Wendell Holmes, Jr: "Taxes are the price we pay for civilization."  In the review in the Wall Street Journal, American politician Paul Ryan states: "Yet at its core The Price of Civilization is not about taxes or economics. It is about the 'pursuit of happiness' as one academic understands it."

The book focuses on the changes going on in the world, the effects of these changes on the economic conditions and the necessary actions that will be required to deal with these changes in this new world if America is going to succeed.

Sachs criticizes excessive lobbying for interfering with democracy, and sees America's two-party system as stifling lesser parties. He blames the first past the post voting arrangement for being one of the factors leading to a two-party system:

A Chinese translation of the book was published in 2013.

See also
 Corporatocracy
 Lobbying in the United States

References

External links 
Facebook page for Jeffrey Sachs
Facebook page for The Price of Civilization
Random House profile on book
Bodley Head UK page for The Price of Civilization
YouTube video on book
Interview about the book on The Young Turks
www.kirkusreviews.com Book Review

Review from the Guardian UK.
Reuters review.
WSJ review
Interview from WNYC.org The Take Away October 7, 2011
Interview on  Bloomberg TV October 7, 2011 to discuss book.
Jeffrey Sachs on Morning Joe discussing The Price of Civilization October 2011

Books about economic policy
2011 non-fiction books
Random House books
The Bodley Head books